Shwetha Srivatsav is an Indian actress, known for her work in Kannada cinema and television. She began her career in theatre, before moving to television, where she received recognition for her role in T. N. Seetharam's Manvantara. She subsequently went on to work in films. Having made her film debut with Mukha Mukhi (2006), she shot to fame with her performance in Simple Agi Ondh Love Story (2013). Her performance in Fair & Lovely (2014) won her the Filmfare Award South for Best Actress.

Career 
Shwetha took part in a theatre workshop conducted by B. V. Karanth, circa 1997, when she was in class six. She was later cast in the television soap Jwalamukhi, directed by T. N. Seetharam. Shwetha subsequently went on to appear in many telefilms and teleplays before being cast in Seetharam's Manvantara.

After appearing in a host of plays and television projects, Shwetha made her film acting debut in a parallel film Mukha Mukhi (2006). She appeared in a small role in the gangster film Aa Dinagalu (2007) before taking up a lead role in the film Cyber Yugadol Nava Yuva Madhura Prema Kavyam (2012). She won the Filmfare Best Female Debut award for her performance in the film. Following this, she featured in the much acclaimed blockbuster film Simple Agi Ondh Love Story (2013) which earned her wide appreciation for her portrayal of a bubbly girl character and her dialogue delivery. She was in the 2014 film Fair & Lovely, in which she played the character of a sex worker opposite to Prem, a role for which she won the Filmfare Award for Best Actress – Kannada. She has announced a Telugu film "Bommala Ramaram" with a debutant director. She was in the 2016 film Kiragoorina Gayyaligalu, with a story based on the novel with the same name by the well-known writer Poornachandra Tejaswi and directed by Sumana Kittur.
Shwetha also became the brand ambassador of an international fashion company "Shinayele".

After taking three years of her maternity break from not doing films she signed her first film in 2019 titled as Rahadhari. It is directed by Girish Vairamudi where she will be essaying the role of a cop.

Personal life
Shwetha's father L. Krishnappa was a theatre artist. She began her schooling at New Cambridge English School in Vijayanagar, Bangalore and completed high school education at Vidya Peeta, graduation from Christ College and obtained a master's degree in mass communication from Central College, all in Bangalore.

Shwetha met Amith Srivatsav during the making of the telefilm Lakshmi Kataksha. After four years of courtship, they married in 2015. They have a daughter together (born 2017).

Filmography
 All Films are in Kannada, Otherwise noted the language.

Television
 Nijagallinarani - A Teleplay aired on Doordarshan
 Kamali - A Telefilm aired on Doordarshan
 Lakshmi Kataksha - A Telfilm aired on ETV Kannada directed by Prema Karanth
 Jwalamukhi - A Teleserial aired on Udaya TV directed by T. N. Seetharam
 Malebillu - A Teleserial directed by T. N. Seetharam
 Manvantara - A Teleserial aired on ETV Kannada directed by T. N. Seetharam
 Silli Lalli - A Teleserial aired on ETV Kannada directed by Sihi Kahi Chandru

Awards and nominations

References

External links
 

Living people
Indian film actresses
Indian television actresses
Indian stage actresses
Actresses from Karnataka
Actresses in Kannada cinema
21st-century Indian actresses
Filmfare Awards South winners
Actresses in Telugu cinema
Actresses in Kannada television
Year of birth missing (living people)